(1965) van de Kamp, provisional designation , is a stony asteroid from the central region of the asteroid belt, approximately 12 kilometers in diameter. It was discovered on 24 September 1960, by Dutch astronomer couple Ingrid and Cornelis van Houten at Leiden Observatory, on photographic plates taken by Dutch–American astronomer Tom Gehrels at the U.S Palomar Observatory, California. It was later named after Dutch astronomer Peter van de Kamp.

Orbit and classification 

The S-type asteroid orbits the Sun in the central main-belt at a distance of 2.3–2.8 AU once every 4 years and 1 month (1,503 days). Its orbit has an eccentricity of 0.11 and an inclination of 2° with respect to the ecliptic. Its first used observation was taken at Goethe Link Observatory in 1956, extending the body's observation arc by 4 years prior to its official discovery observation.

Palomar–Leiden survey 

The survey designation "P-L" stands for Palomar–Leiden, named after Palomar Observatory and Leiden Observatory, which collaborated on the fruitful Palomar–Leiden survey in the 1960s. Gehrels used Palomar's Samuel Oschin telescope (also known as the 48-inch Schmidt Telescope), and shipped the photographic plates to Ingrid and Cornelis van Houten at Leiden Observatory where astrometry was carried out. The trio are credited with the discovery of several thousand minor planets.

Physical characteristics 

In February 2011, a fragmentary and inconclusive rotational lightcurve was obtained for this asteroid. It gave a longer than average rotation period of at least 36 hours with a brightness amplitude of 0.5 magnitude.

According to the surveys carried out by the Japanese Akari satellite and NASA's Wide-field Infrared Survey Explorer with its subsequent NEOWISE mission, the asteroid measures 11.8 and 13.6 kilometers in diameter and its surface has an albedo of 0.151 and 0.225, respectively. The Collaborative Asteroid Lightcurve Link assumes a standard albedo for stony asteroids of 0.20 and calculates a diameter of 11.3 kilometers with an absolute magnitude of 12.1.

Naming 

This minor planet was named after Dutch astronomer Peter van de Kamp (1901–1995), director of Sproul Observatory and known for his research on astrometric binaries. The approved naming citation was published by the Minor Planet Center on 1 December 1979.

References

External links 
 Asteroid Lightcurve Database (LCDB), query form (info )
 Dictionary of Minor Planet Names, Google books
 Asteroids and comets rotation curves, CdR – Observatoire de Genève, Raoul Behrend
 Discovery Circumstances: Numbered Minor Planets (1)-(5000) – Minor Planet Center
 
 

001965
2521
Discoveries by Cornelis Johannes van Houten
Discoveries by Ingrid van Houten-Groeneveld
Discoveries by Tom Gehrels
Named minor planets
19600924